Wirada is a genus of comb-footed spiders (family Theridiidae) that was first described by Eugen von Keyserling in 1886.

Species
 it contains six species, found in South America and Mexico:
Wirada araucaria Lise, Silva & Bertoncello, 2009 – Brazil
Wirada mexicana Campuzano & Ibarra-Núñez, 2018 – Mexico
Wirada punctata Keyserling, 1886 (type) – Venezuela, Ecuador, Peru
Wirada sigillata Lise, Silva & Bertoncello, 2009 – Brazil, Argentina
Wirada tijuca Levi, 1967 – Brazil
Wirada tovarensis Simon, 1895 – Venezuela

In synonymy:
W. rugithorax Simon, 1895 = Wirada punctata Keyserling, 1886

See also
 List of Theridiidae species

References

Further reading

Araneomorphae genera
Spiders of South America
Taxa named by Eugen von Keyserling
Theridiidae